Glipa vittatipennis is a species of beetle in the genus Glipa. It was described in 1928.

References

vittatipennis
Beetles described in 1928